Gonçalo do Lago Pontes Esteves (born 27 February 2004) is a Portuguese professional footballer who plays as a right-back for Sporting CP.

Club career
Born in Aboim das Choças, Arcos de Valdevez, Esteves started his career with ADC Aboim/Sabadim, before joining Porto. He also spent time on a youth loan at Padroense.

Esteves signed for Sporting CP from Porto in July 2021. He settled well at his new club, and within a week had impressed first-team manager Rúben Amorim enough to secure a place in first team training. 

Following good performances for the Lisbon side's B team, Esteves was included in The Guardians "Next Generation" list for 2021. He scored his first goal for Sporting's B team in a 2–0 victory over Cova da Piedade on 1 October 2021. Two weeks later, he made his first-team debut in the third round of the Taça de Portugal, starting in a 4–0 win at C.F. Os Belenenses. His Primeira Liga debut came on 18 December, again starting in a 3–0 win at Gil Vicente FC; he had been guaranteed his place by Amorim due to the absences of Pedro Porro and Ricardo Esgaio through injury and COVID-19 respectively.

On 30 June 2022, Esteves was loaned to fellow top-flight team G.D. Estoril Praia for the upcoming season. In his second game on 14 August, he was sent off after an hour of a 1–0 loss at Vitória de Guimarães.

International career
Esteves has represented Portugal at youth international level.

Personal life
Esteves' older brother, Tomás, is also a footballer and a defender.

Career statistics

Club

Notes

References

2004 births
Living people
People from Arcos de Valdevez
Sportspeople from Viana do Castelo District
Portuguese footballers
Portugal youth international footballers
Association football defenders
FC Porto players
Padroense F.C. players
Sporting CP footballers
Sporting CP B players
G.D. Estoril Praia players
Primeira Liga players